The 2014 Wyoming gubernatorial election was held on November 4, 2014, to elect the governor of Wyoming. The election coincided with elections to other federal and state offices.

Incumbent Republican Governor Matt Mead ran for re-election to a second term in office. Mead won the election with 59% of the vote, defeating Democrat Pete Gosar, Independent candidate Don Wills and Libertarian Dee Cozzens.

Republican primary

Candidates

Declared
 Taylor Haynes, physician, rancher and Independent write-in candidate for Governor in 2010
 Cindy Hill, State Superintendent of Public Instruction
 Matt Mead, incumbent Governor

Polling

Results

Democratic primary

Candidates

Declared
 Pete Gosar, former chairman of the Wyoming Democratic Party, candidate for governor in 2010 and brother of Arizona Republican U.S. Representative Paul Gosar

Results

General election

Predictions

Polling

With Mead

With Hill

Results

References

External links
 Wyoming gubernatorial election, 2014 at Ballotpedia

Official campaign websites (Archived)
 Matt Mead incumbent
 Pete Gosar
 Taylor Haynes
 Cindy Hill

2014 Wyoming elections
2014
2014 United States gubernatorial elections